Deng Weiyun is a Chinese sport shooter. She represents China at the 2020 Summer Olympics in Tokyo.

References

1996 births
Living people
Chinese female sport shooters
Shooters at the 2020 Summer Olympics
Olympic shooters of China
Sportspeople from Shanghai
21st-century Chinese women